Dragan Perić (born 12 February 1961) is a Bosnian Croat professional football manager. He has worked as a manager and assistant manager at Bosnian Premier League club Zrinjski Mostar.

Perić was also an assistant coach in the Bosnia and Herzegovina U21 and senior national teams.

Managerial career
Perić started his managerial career in 2004 as an assistant manager of Franjo Džidić at hometown club Zrinjski Mostar. He stayed as an assistant until 2010, after which he became an assistant coach of Vlado Jagodić in the Bosnia and Herzegovina U21 national team on 10 May 2011. Simultaneously, Perić was named Zrinjski Mostar manager on 19 June 2012. He resigned as Zrinjski's manager on 31 March 2013.

On 27 December 2014, Perić became the assistant of Mehmed Baždarević in the Bosnia and Herzegovina national team. He stayed as assistant coach until October 2017, that is after Baždarević's contract expiration with the Bosnia and Herzegovina FA.

Managerial statistics

References

External links
Dragan Perić at Sportsport.ba

1961 births
Living people
Sportspeople from Mostar
Croats of Bosnia and Herzegovina
Bosnia and Herzegovina football managers
HŠK Zrinjski managers
Premier League of Bosnia and Herzegovina managers